Michael McCarron (born March 7, 1995) is an American professional ice hockey player. He is currently playing for the  Nashville Predators in the National Hockey League (NHL). McCarron was selected by the Montreal Canadiens in the first round (25th overall) of the 2013 NHL Entry Draft.

Playing career
As a youth, he played in the 2008 Quebec International Pee-Wee Hockey Tournament with the Detroit Belle Tire minor ice hockey team.

McCarron was rated as a top prospect who fulfilled the expectation to be a first round selection at the 2013 NHL Entry Draft. He trained with the USA Hockey National Team Development Program team from 2011 to 2013, and won a Silver Medal with Team USA at the 2013 IIHF World U18 Championships.

McCarron initially committed to play for the National Collegiate Athletic Association (NCAA) Western Michigan University Broncos, before opting out to continue his development through Canadian junior ranks with the London Knights in the Ontario Hockey League. Originally playing (and drafted) as a right winger, McCarron made the switch to center during his first OHL season. On July 11, 2013, McCarron was signed to a three-year entry-level contract with the Montreal Canadiens.

In the midst of the 2014–15 season, McCarron was traded by the Knights to OHL contenders, the Oshawa Generals on January 1, 2015, with whom he won the J. Ross Robertson Cup and the Memorial Cup.

After a good start in his first professional year in 2015–16, he was called up by the Canadiens and played two games in the NHL, though without picking up any points. As a result of his good play in the AHL, McCarron was named to the 2016 AHL All-Star Classic. He was later called up again by the Canadiens on February 26, 2016, after forwards Dale Weise and Tomáš Fleischmann were traded to the Blackhawks. On the 27th, he recorded his first NHL point, an assist on a Devante Smith-Pelly goal. He scored his first NHL goal in a 4–1 loss to the Calgary Flames on March 20, 2016.

While playing with the Laval Rocket during the 2018–19 season, McCarron underwent season-ending surgery on his left shoulder in February 2019.

McCarron became a restricted free agent after the 2018–19 season. On July 27, 2019, he signed a one-year, two-way contract with the Canadiens.

Continuing with the Laval Rocket, McCarron entered the 2019–20 season, contributing with 5 goals and 14 points in 29 games. Having been passed on the depth chart and with limited prospects with the Canadiens, McCarron was traded to the Nashville Predators in exchange for Laurent Dauphin on January 7, 2020.

Career statistics

Regular season and playoffs

International

Awards and honors

References

External links 

1995 births
Living people
American men's ice hockey right wingers
Ice hockey players from Michigan
Laval Rocket players
London Knights players
Milwaukee Admirals players
Montreal Canadiens draft picks
Montreal Canadiens players
Nashville Predators players
National Hockey League first-round draft picks
Oshawa Generals players
St. John's IceCaps players
USA Hockey National Team Development Program players